Palmer State Park is a public recreation area located along Deer Creek two miles southwest of Dublin in Harford County, Maryland. The state park saw its genesis in 1965, when Gerald and Ruth Palmer donated 463 acres for use as a public park. The park's historic industrial sites include remnants of the Husband Flint Mill and Deer Creek Iron Works. The heavily forested area is open to canoeing, fishing, and hiking.

References

External links
Palmer State Park Maryland Department of Natural Resources
Palmer State Park Map Maryland Department of Natural Resources

Parks in Harford County, Maryland
State parks of Maryland
Protected areas established in 1965
IUCN Category III